Hamilton Square located in Birkenhead, Wirral, England is a town square surrounded by Georgian terraces

Hamilton Square may also refer to:

 Birkenhead Hamilton Square railway station an underground railway station located at Hamilton Square in Birkenhead, Wirral, England
 Hamilton Square, New Jersey a census-designated place (CDP) and unincorporated community located within Hamilton Township, in Mercer County, New Jersey, United States
 Hamilton Square, Pennsylvania is an unincorporated community in Hamilton Township, Monroe County, Pennsylvania, United States
 Hamilton Square Baptist Church protests a protest that occurred in 1993